Joel Beckett (born Joel Bygraves; 27 November 1973) is an English actor, known for playing Jake Moon in the BBC soap opera EastEnders and as Lee in the original version of the comedy series The Office. Born in Potton, Bedfordshire, he was educated at Bedford School. He also appeared in other television series such as Holby City and Band of Brothers. In 2005 he appeared in the film Green Street as a pub landlord.

Filmography

Films

TV

References

External links
 

English male soap opera actors
Living people
People educated at Bedford School
1973 births
People from Potton